Handball is an Olympic team sport.

Handball may also refer to:
 American handball
 Australian handball
 Beach handball
 Chinese handball, a variant of American handball popular in New York City during the 1960s and 1970s
 Czech handball, an outdoor ball game
 Field handball, the original outdoor team handball, played at the 1936 Olympics
 Frisian handball
 Gaelic handball, a sport played in Ireland
 Handball (school), a game played on grids of squares in schoolyards in Australia and New Zealand, also known as four square
 Handball (Australian rules football), a legal method of disposing of the ball and an alternative to a footpass
 Handball (video game series), a video game series which simulates handball
 Handball, a foul for illegal use of hands (or arms) in association football
 Welsh handball

See also